Unstruttal is a municipality in the Unstrut-Hainich-Kreis district of Thuringia, Germany. It was created in September 1995 by the merger of the former municipalities Ammern, Dachrieden, Eigenrode, Horsmar, Kaisershagen and Reiser. In January 2023 Unstruttal absorbed the former municipality Menteroda, the villages Dörna and Lengefeld from the former municipality Anrode, and Zaunröden from the former municipality Dünwald.

References 

Unstrut-Hainich-Kreis